Homo Deus: A Brief History of Tomorrow (Hebrew: ההיסטוריה של המחר, English: The History of the Tomorrow) is a book written by Israeli author Yuval Noah Harari, professor at the Hebrew University in Jerusalem. The book was first published in Hebrew in 2015 by Dvir publishing; the English-language version was published in September 2016 in the United Kingdom and in February 2017 in the United States.

As with its predecessor, Sapiens: A Brief History of Humankind, Harari recounts the course of human history while describing events and the individual human experience, along with ethical issues in relation to his historical survey. However, Homo Deus (from Latin "Homo" meaning man or human and "Deus" meaning God) deals more with the abilities acquired by humans throughout their existence, and their evolution as the dominant species in the world. The book describes mankind's current abilities and achievements and attempts to paint an image of the future. Many philosophical issues are discussed, such as humanism, individualism, transhumanism, and mortality.

Summary 
The premise outlines that during the 21st century, humanity is likely to make a significant attempt to gain happiness, immortality, and God-like powers. Throughout the book, Harari openly speculates various ways that this ambition might be realised in the future based on the past and present.

conquers the world 
 The first part of the book explores the relationship between humans and other animals, exploring what led to the former's dominance.

gives meaning to the world 
 Since the language revolution some 70,000 years ago, humans have lived within an "intersubjective reality", such as countries, borders, religion, money and companies, all created to enable large-scale, flexible cooperation between different individual human beings. Humanity is separated from other animals by humans' ability to believe in these intersubjective constructs that exist only in the human mind and are given force through collective belief.
 Humankind's immense ability to give meaning to its actions and thoughts is what has enabled its many achievements.
 Harari argues that humanism is a form of religion that worships humankind instead of a god. It puts humankind and its desires as a top priority in the world, in which humans themselves are framed as the dominant beings. Humanists believe that ethics and values are derived internally within each individual, rather than from an external source. During the 21st century, Harari believes that humanism may push humans to search for immortality, happiness, and power.

loses control 
 Technological developments have threatened the continued ability of humans to give meaning to their lives; Harari suggests the possilibity of the replacement of humankind with the super-man, or "homo deus" (human god) endowed with abilities such as eternal life.
 The last chapter suggests the possibility that humans are algorithms, and as such  may not be dominant in a universe where big data becomes a paradigm. As humans absorb more data, they become more algorithmic and more efficient at processing data, which gives human deeper emotions and superior intellectual abilities. However, the rapidly growing data may ultimately consume human in a sense that nothing that originally make us human is left, and make human obsolete.
The book closes with the following question addressed to the reader:"What will happen to society, politics and daily life when non-conscious but highly intelligent algorithms know us better than we know ourselves?"

Awards and honors 
 Time magazine listed Homo Deus as one of its top ten non-fiction books of 2017.
 Wellcome longlisted Homo Deus for their 2017 Book Prize.

Reception 
Homo Deus was reviewed or discussed in The New York Times, The Guardian, The Economist, The New Yorker, NPR, Financial Times, and Times Higher Education. The review aggregator website Book Marks reported that 43% of critics gave the book a "rave" review, whilst the rest of the critics expressed either "positive" (29%) or "mixed" (29%) impressions, based on a sample of seven reviews.

The review points out that "Harari cares about the fate of animals in a human world but he writes about the prospects for Homo sapiens in a data-driven world with a lofty insouciance." Runciman nonetheless gave the book a generally positive review.

In a mixed review, The Economist called Homo Deus "a glib work, full of corner-cutting sleights of hand and unsatisfactory generalisations" and stated that "Mr Harari has a tendency towards scientific name-dropping—words like biotech, nanotechnology and artificial intelligence abound—but he rarely engages with these topics in any serious way."

Writing in the Journal of Evolution and Technology, Allan McCay has challenged Harari's claims about human algorithmic agency.

Steve Aoki's song "Homo Deus" on the album Neon Future IV is named after the book and features Harari's narration of the audiobook.

Translations
The following translations have become available:

 English: September 2016
 Spanish: October 2016
 Portuguese: November 2016
 Turkish: December 2016
 Chinese: January 2017
 German: February 2017 (by Andreas Wirthensohn)
 Dutch: February 2017
 Hungarian: April 2017
 Croatian: May 2017
 Italian: May 2017, Bompiani
 Korean: May 2017
 Finnish: September 2017
 French: September 2017
 Norwegian: 2017, Bazar
 Greek: December 2017
 Czech: December 2017
 Danish: August 2017
 Slovene: 2017, 2019
 Lithuanian: February 2018
 Persian: March 2018
 Romanian: March 2018
 Russian: March 2018
 Bulgarian: April 2018
 Polish: April 2018
 Ukrainian: May 2018
 Albanian: June 2018
 Vietnamese: July 2018
 Japanese: September 2018
 Serbian: September 2018
 Marathi: November 2018
 Thai: September 2019
 Macedonian: 2019
 Mongolian: 2020
 Indonesian: May 2018
 Arabic: November 2021
 Tamil : 2019
 Malayalam: 2020
 Urdu: 2019

See also

 Sapiens: A Brief History of Humankind
 21 Lessons for the 21st Century

Notes and references

External links 
 Public conversation on the book with BBC producer at London's Emmanuel Centre on 5 September 2016 – 1 hour 31 minutes, including Q&A. Intelligence Squared/YouTube
 Book review of Homo Deus: A Brief History of Tomorrow. In Med Health Care and Philos (2018). Retrieved 16 August 2018.

2015 non-fiction books
Books about human intelligence
Books about historiography
History books about civilization
Books by Yuval Noah Harari
Transhumanist books
Futurology books
Harvill Secker books